James Charles Dempsey (August 30, 1908 – July 9, 1979), was a decorated submarine commander during World War II who reached the rank of Rear Admiral in the United States Navy. He died, aged 70, on July 9, 1979, of congestive heart and kidney failure at the Portsmouth Naval Hospital in Norfolk, Virginia.

As submarine commander of the USS-37, he sank the first enemy destroyer in World War II on February 8, 1942.

For this action, he was awarded a Navy Cross. According to the official award citation, it was awarded "For extraordinary heroism and distinguished service in the line of his profession as Commanding Officer of the USS-37, in offensive action in the Straits of Makassar on February 8, 1942...Lieutenant Dempsey attacked four vessels...at close range, completely destroying one of them in the engagement."

As commander of the USS Spearfish a few months later, Dempsey helped to evacuate the last Americans from the island of Corregidor before it fell to the Japanese on May 6, 1942. On May 3, Dempsey led the Spearfish into hostile waters around Corregidor island. According to a historian of submarine operations in World War II, "Spearfish (Lieutenant Commander J.C. Dempsey) was the last submarine to visit crumbling Corregidor. On May 3 she evacuated 12 Army and Navy officers, 11 Army nurses, a Navy nurse and a civilian woman…the last of Corregidor’s defenders to be reprieved. Here again was proof of the submersible’s ability to operate unsupported in waters under enemy control. With Japanese warships on every hand, Spearfish got in and got out, accomplishing one of the war’s most perilous rescue missions...".

For Dempsey's "extraordinary heroism and conspicuous devotion to duty", he won a gold star, in lieu of a second Navy Cross, for this accomplishment.

His evacuation of Americans from Corregidor, which included Army and Navy nurses, was later fictionalized in the 1959 Hollywood film, "Operation Petticoat," which starred Cary Grant as the commander of the submarine.

His exploits were also been recreated in the late 1950s TV series, The Silent Service, where he was portrayed in three episodes by DeForest Kelley.

References

1908 births
1979 deaths
Military personnel from Maryland
United States Navy rear admirals (lower half)
Recipients of the Navy Cross (United States)
United States Navy personnel of World War II
Deaths from kidney failure
Recipients of the Silver Star
United States Naval Academy alumni